Philippe Lakos (born August 19, 1980) is an Austrian former professional ice hockey defenceman who most notably played with the Vienna Capitals of the ICE Hockey League (ICEHL). He played 19 seasons with hometown club, the Capitals through to the 2021–22 season, and is currently the Franchise record holder with 755 regular season appearances.

He participated at the 2011 IIHF World Championship as a member of the Austria men's national ice hockey team.

References

External links

1980 births
Ice hockey people from Vienna
Arkansas RiverBlades players
Augusta Lynx players
Austrian ice hockey defencemen
Florida Everblades players
HC TWK Innsbruck players
Jacksonville Lizard Kings players
Living people
Reading Royals players
Toledo Storm players
Toronto St. Michael's Majors players
Vienna Capitals players